"For One Day" is a song by New Zealand band Evermore, released as the second single from their debut album, Dreams (2004). In Australia, the song reached number 25 on the ARIA Singles Chart was ranked number 57 on Triple J's Hottest 100 of 2004.

Track listing

Charts

Release history

References

Evermore (band) songs
2005 singles
2004 songs
East West Records singles